Vadim Strogalev; born 9 February 1975) is a retired Russian pole vaulter.

He finished seventh at the 1997 World Championships in Athens and ninth at the 2003 World Championships in Paris.

His personal best jump is 5.85 metres, achieved in May 1998 in Chania.

Competition record

References

1975 births
Living people
Russian male pole vaulters
Olympic male pole vaulters
Olympic athletes of Russia
Athletes (track and field) at the 2004 Summer Olympics
Competitors at the 1998 Goodwill Games
World Athletics Championships athletes for Russia